Geranium psilostemon, commonly called Armenian cranesbill, is a species of hardy flowering herbaceous perennial plant in the genus Geranium, family Geraniaceae. It is native to Turkey, Armenia, Azerbaijan, and the Russian Federation. It is cultivated as a garden subject, and a number of different cultivars exist.

The Latin specific epithet psilostemon means "with smooth stamens".

Like other geranium species, G. psilostemon is useful as underplanting for larger shrubs such as roses. It has earned the Royal Horticultural Society's Award of Garden Merit. The cultivar 'Ivan' has also received the award.

References

psilostemon
Flora of Azerbaijan
Flora of Russia
Flora of Turkey